Military, intelligence
 Dan "Sandow" O'Donovan (1890—1975), Irish Republican Army figure
 Donal II O'Donovan (died 1639), the O'Donovan of Clann Cathail, Lord of Clancahill 
 Donal III O'Donovan (died 1660), Irish Confederate Wars
 Donal IV O'Donovan (died 1705), Williamite War in Ireland
 Jeremiah O'Donovan (died 1709), O'Donovan of Clanloughlin, Registrar for the Admiralty (Ireland) under James II
 Jeremiah O'Donovan Rossa (1831—1915), Fenian, Irish Republican Brotherhood figure
 Jerome X. O'Donovan (1944—2014), US Marine Corps captain, New York City councilman
 Morgan John Winthrop O'Donovan (1893—1969), O'Donovan of Clancahill
 Morgan William II O'Donovan (1861—1940), O'Donovan of Clancahill
 Richard II O'Donovan (died 1829), O'Donovan of Clancahill
 Seamus O'Donovan (1896–1979), Irish Republican Army figure

Government
 Daniel O'Donovan (MP Doneraile), represented the Manor of Doneraile in James II's Patriot Parliament
 Denis O'Donovan (born 1955), Irish politician, former Cathaoirleach of Seanad Éireann
James O'Donovan, forensic scientist to the Garda Technical Bureau of the Garda Síochána
John James O'Donovan, better known as Seán O'Donovan, (1893–1975),  Irish Fianna Fáil politician and Veterinarian
Patrick O'Donovan, (1977-), Irish Fine Gael politician 
Reubin Askew (Reubin O'Donovan Askew) (1928-2014), American politician
 Timothy O'Donovan (1881—1951), Irish politician, Cathaoirleach of Seanad Éireann
 William O'Donovan (1886—1955), British Conservative Party politician

Business & Finance 
 Val O'Donovan (1936—2005), Cork-born Canadian electrical engineer, businessman, co-founder of COM DEV and Chancellor of the University of Waterloo

Religion
Dennis J. O'Donovan, (d. 1892), American Roman Catholic pries
Gerald O'Donovan, (born Jeremiah Donovan; 1871-1942), Irish priest and writer.
Oliver O'Donovan (born 1945), theologian
Prue O’Donovan,  Archdeacon of Flinders in the Anglican Diocese of Willochra

Academia
 Leo J. O'Donovan (born 1934), former President of Georgetown University
Michael C. O'Donovan, Scottish psychiatric geneticist

Sport
Ambrose O'Donovan, (1962-), former Gaelic footballer
Conor O'Donovan, (1962-), former Irish hurler
Darragh O'Donovan, (1995-), Irish hurler
Domhnall O'Donovan, (1988-), Irish hurler
Fachtna O'Donovan, (1921-1995) Irish Gaelic footballer
Gary O'Donovan (1992-), Irish rower
John Francis O’Donovan, (1918-1999) Irish chess master
Niall O'Donovan, Irish rugby union coach
Ollie O'Donovan (b. 1966), Irish rallycross driver
Paul O'Donovan, (1994-), Irish rower
Roy O'Donovan, (1985-), Irish professional footballer

Entertainment
Aoife O'Donovan, (1982-), Irish-American singer and songwriter.
Frank O'Donovan, (1900–1974), Irish actor, singer and songwriter
Maeve O'Donovan (b. 1990), singer-songwriter from Limerick, Ireland
Máirín O'Donovan, (1936-), Irish actress, singer, and dancer
Noel O'Donovan, (1949-2019), Irish actor
 Ross O'Donovan (born 1987), animator and co-host of YouTube webseries, Steam Train

Fictional
Liam O'Donovan (Tracy Beaker Returns), Tracy Beaker character

Other 
 Barra Ó Donnabháin (1941—2003), Irish language columnist, The Irish Echo
Brian O'Donovan, (1980-), Irish journalist
Daniel O'Donovan of Mahoonagh and Feenagh, was the hereditary chief of the remnants of the Ui- Donnabhain of the Uí Fidgenti,
 Edwin O'Donovan (1914-2000), American art director
 Fred O'Donovan (theatre producer) (1930–2010), Irish theatre producer and businessman
 Fred O'Donovan (actor) (1884–1952), Irish actor, film maker and theatre manager
Gerard O'Donovan, (1958-), Irish author
 Gerald O'Donovan (1871—1972), writer
 Ímar Ua Donnubáin, or Ivor O'Donovan, a legendary and celebrated petty king, navigator, trader, and reputed necromancer of 13th century Ireland
Mary Jane O'Donovan Rossa, (1845-1916), Irish poet and political activist
 Michael Francis O'Donovan (1903—1966), Irish author Frank O'Connor
 William Rudolf O'Donovan (1844—1920), American sculptor

See also
 Donovan (disambiguation)
John O'Donovan (disambiguation)
William O'Donovan (disambiguation)
O'Donovan Rossa (Skibbereen) GAA, Gaelic football and hurling club

Surnames of Irish origin
O'Donovan family